Strongylophthalmyia is a species of slender, long-legged fly.

Distribution
Andorra, Britain, Czech Republic, Denmark, Estonia, Finland, Germany, Hungary, Latvia, Poland, Romania, Slovakia & Sweden.

References 

Nerioidea
Diptera of Europe
Insects described in 1844